Sinum grayi is a species of predatory sea snail, a marine gastropod mollusk in the family Naticidae, the moon snails.

Description
The length of the shell attains 48.3 mm.

Distribution
This species occurs in the Pacific Ocean from Peru to Chile

References

 Chenu, 1843 Parts 16. In Illustrations Conchyliologiques ou description et figures de toutes les coquilles connues vivantes et fossiles, classées suivant le système de Lamarck modifié d'après les progrès de la science et comprenant les genres nouveaux et les espèces récemment découvertes, p. Sigaretus pp 9-12 ; Poronia pp 1-3 ; Glycimeris pp 1 ; Tubicinella pp ; Corbis pp 1 ; Strombus pl 1 ; Spondylus pl 7 ; Balanus pl 5, 6 ; Magilus pl 2
 Keen, A. M. (1971). Sea Shells of Tropical West America. Marine mollusks from Baja California to Peru. ed. 2. Stanford University Press. xv, 1064 pp., 22 pls.
 Torigoe K. & Inaba A. (2011). Revision on the classification of Recent Naticidae. Bulletin of the Nishinomiya Shell Museum. 7: 133 + 15 pp., 4 pls

External links
 

Naticidae
Gastropods described in 1843